Anthony Ikegu (born 10 February 1963) is a Kenyan boxer. He competed in the men's flyweight event at the 1988 Summer Olympics.

References

External links
 

1963 births
Living people
Kenyan male boxers
Olympic boxers of Kenya
Boxers at the 1988 Summer Olympics
Place of birth missing (living people)
Flyweight boxers